Sk8 (also known as Skate) is a half-hour teen drama that aired on NBC's TNBC Saturday morning programming block from October 6, 2001 to January 5, 2002 with 13 episodes produced. The show continued in reruns until TNBC's dissolution and replacement by programming leased from Discovery Kids by NBC starting in September 2002.

The series was co-created by Thomas W. Lynch, who also co-created Just Deal, TNBC's first single-camera format series, with Sk8 becoming the second and final series on the lineup to be shot in the same format.

Premise
The show featured storylines concerning the life of an aspiring pro skater and his relationships with a motley crew of friends. The show featured guest appearances by professional skateboarders and guerrilla film and video shooting styles.

Cast
 Christopher Jorgens as Josh Raden
 Jorgito Vargas, Jr. as Dim
 Adrienne Carter as Michelle
 Claudette Mink as Whitney Lass
 Blair Wingo as Vanessa
 Noel Fisher as Alex
 Darcy Laurie as Gideon
 Pua Kekaula as Dom
 Bryce Hodgson Les
 Anthony Harrison as Peter Raden

Episodes

References

External links
 

2000s American teen drama television series
2000s Canadian teen drama television series
2001 American television series debuts
2001 Canadian television series debuts
2002 American television series endings
2002 Canadian television series endings
English-language television shows
NBC original programming
Skateboarding mass media
TNBC